The Parti démocratie chrétienne du Québec fielded twenty-five candidates in the 2003 Quebec provincial election, none of whom were elected.

Candidates

References

Candidates in Quebec provincial elections
2003